Lieutenant-Colonel James Frederick Dudley Crichton-Stuart (17 February 1824 – 24 October 1891) was a British soldier and Liberal politician.

Crichton-Stuart was the son of Lord Patrick Crichton-Stuart and a great-great-grandson of Prime Minister John Stuart, 3rd Earl of Bute. His mother was Hannah, daughter of William Tighe, MP. He served with the Grenadier Guards and achieved the rank of lieutenant-colonel. In 1859 he was returned to Parliament for Cardiff, a seat previously held by his father, and represented this constituency in the House of Commons until 1880. Between 1859 and 1891 he also served as Lord-Lieutenant of Buteshire.

Crichton-Stuart married Gertrude Frances, daughter of Sir George Hamilton Seymour, in 1864. They had several children. Crichton-Stuart died in October 1891, aged 67. His wife survived him by eighteen years and died in December 1909.

References

www.thepeerage.com

External links 
 

1824 births
1891 deaths
Grenadier Guards officers
Liberal Party (UK) MPs for Welsh constituencies
Lord-Lieutenants of Buteshire
Members of the Parliament of the United Kingdom for Cardiff constituencies
UK MPs 1857–1859
UK MPs 1859–1865
UK MPs 1865–1868
UK MPs 1868–1874
UK MPs 1874–1880
James Stuart